Simonen is a Finnish surname. Notable people with the surname include:

 Aarre Simonen (1913–1977), Finnish lawyer and politician
 Emilia Simonen (born 1996), Finnish pair skater
 Heikki Simonen (1902–1975), Finnish politician
 Mari Simonen (born 1951), Finnish United Nations officials
 Vieno Simonen (1898–1994), Finnish politician and farmer

Finnish-language surnames